Wilno-Troki County was a county with capital in Vilnius located in Wilno Land, and later, Wilno Voivodeship, in Poland. It originated from informal unification of administration, between the counties of Wilno and Troki, that existed from 1921 to 1922 within the Republic of Central Lithuania, and from 1922 to 1923 or 1924 in Poland. Between 1923 and 1924, two counties were officially joined to form one county, that until 1926 was located in Wilno Land, and from 1926 to 1939, in Wilno Voivodeship.

Municipalities

Urban 
 Nowa Wilejka
 Trakai

Rular 
 Gierwiaty
 Mejszagoła
 Mickuny
 Niemenczyn
 Olkieniki
 Orany (1926–1939)
 Podbrzezie
 Rudomino
 Rudziszki
 Rzesza
 Soleczniki
 Szumsk
 Troki
 Turgiele
 Worniany
 Janiszki (until 1926)
 Koniawa (1926–1930)

Citations

Notes

References

Bibliography 
 Zeszyt VII. Spis ludności na terenach administrowanych przez Zarząd Cywilny Ziem Wschodnich (grudzień 1919). Lviv/Warsaw. Książnica Polska T-wa Naucz. Szkół Wyższych. 1920, p. 50, series: Prace geograficzne wydawane by Eugenjusz Romer.
 Zarząd Cywilny Ziem Wschodnich (19 lutego 1919 – 9 września 1920) by Joanna Gierowska-Kałłaur, 1st edition. Warsaw. Wydawnictwo Neriton. Instytut Historii PAN. 2003. p. 447. ISBN 83-88973-60-6.

Wilno Voivodeship (1926–1939)
States and territories established in 1921
States and territories established in 1923
States and territories established in 1924
States and territories disestablished in 1939
Former counties of Poland